Papagou-Cholargos is a municipality in the North Athens regional unit, Attica, Greece. The seat of the municipality is the town Cholargos.

Municipality
The municipality Papagou-Cholargos was formed at the 2011 local government reform by the merger of the following 2 former municipalities, that became municipal units:
Cholargos
Papagou

The municipality has an area of 7.325 km2.

References

Municipalities of Attica
Populated places in North Athens (regional unit)